Aeroflot Flight 245 was a scheduled domestic passenger flight operated by an Ilyushin Il-18B that crashed during the cruise phase of the flight en route to Sochi on Sunday 
17 December 1961, resulting in the death of all 59 people on board. An investigation revealed the aircraft entered a steep dive after the flaps were accidentally extended.

Accident
Flight 245 was a scheduled passenger flight from Vnukovo to Sochi. At 14:34 Moscow time the Ilyushin departed Vnukovo International Airport and climbed to its cruising altitude of 8,000 meters.  At 15:47 the crew  contacted ATC and gave a position report, then the flight again communicated with ATC at 15:52. At 15:59 the controller was unable to raise flight 245 and it disappeared from radar. While in level flight cruising at 630 km/h the flight engineer inadvertently moved the flaps selector to full extension of 40 degrees and due to the large amount of drag and the Ilyushin Il-18's peculiar aerodynamic design the aircraft pitched over and entered a steep descent. Without retracting the flaps it would be almost impossible to regain control of the aircraft and due to the high negative g-force the crew were experiencing they could not reach the flap selector. As the airliner gained speed in its dive the port and starboard flap assemblies were ripped from the wing by high aerodynamic forces. At 16:00 the aircraft impacted the ground at very high speed with the landing gear retracted and at a pitch angle of 107 degrees. The impact crater measured from 3.5 to 5 meters deep and the debris field was 300 to 350 meters in width.

Aircraft
The aircraft involved was an Ilyushin Il-18B, serial number 188000503  and registered as CCCP-75654  to Aeroflot. The construction of the airliner was completed on 30 October 1958 and it had sustained a total of 2,722 flight hours before the crash.

Investigation
Investigators determined that the cause of the accident was the deployment of full flaps at cruising speed. Unlike the Ilyushin Il-14 aircraft, the IL-18 did not have a mechanism to prevent accidental flap selector movement and this was found to be a contributing factor in the accident sequence.

See also
Aeroflot accidents and incidents
Aeroflot accidents and incidents in the 1960s

References

245
Aviation accidents and incidents in 1961
Aviation accidents and incidents in the Soviet Union
Accidents and incidents involving the Ilyushin Il-18